Steven Silva Rodrigues (born 12 February 1985), is an American-born Portuguese footballer who currently plays for Lourosa.

Career
Steven was born in Boston, Massachusetts and subsequently moved to Portugal at the age of four. The right-back has spent his career in the Portuguese second and third divisions.

He originally came up with Boavista F.C. before the Porto-based club fell on hard times and played on loan at União Paredes and Gondomar. Steven spent a year with nelas before moving on to Arouca. After a lengthy stint, he returned to Boavista for a year and then moved back to the second division with Leixões in July 2012.

International career
Steven was called for 2002 UEFA European Under-17 Football Championship representing Portugal.

External links

1985 births
Living people
Soccer players from Boston
Portuguese footballers
Portugal youth international footballers
American soccer players
American people of Portuguese descent
U.S.C. Paredes players
Gondomar S.C. players
F.C. Arouca players
Liga Portugal 2 players
Boavista F.C. players
Leixões S.C. players
U.D. Oliveirense players
S.C. Salgueiros players
Association football defenders